Kallio is a Finnish surname. Notable people with the surname include:

 Albert Kallio (1884–1945), Finnish politician
 Angelika Kallio (born 1972), Finnish model
 Elin Kallio (1859–1927), Finnish gymnast
 Gus Kallio (born in the 1880s), Finnish-born professional wrestler
 Hemmo Kallio (1863-1940), Finnish actor
 Ile Kallio (born 1955), Finnish guitarist and singer
 Jamie Kallio (born 1965), Canadian biathlete
 Kalervo Kallio (1909–1969), Finnish sculptor
 Karoliina Kallio (born 1979), Finnish singer
 Katja Kallio (born 1968), Finnish novelist, journalist, columnist and screenwriter
 Kyösti Kallio (1873–1940), fourth President of Finland
 Maria Kallio, a fictional Finnish police officer in the novel series Maria Kallio by Leena Lehtolainen
 Mika Kallio (born 1982), Finnish motorcycle racer
 Rudy Kallio (1892–1979), American baseball player
 Tomi Kallio (born 1977), Finnish ice hockey player
 Toni Kallio (born 1978), Finnish footballer
 Väinö Kallio (1897–1938), Finland politician
 Varma Kallio (1920–2003), Finnish politician

See also

Kalli (name)

Finnish-language surnames